The Niall Smullen Cup was a Gaelic football competition organised by Kildare Gaelic Athletic Association in Ireland. Founded in 1925, it was named after Niall Smullen, who played for Sallins GAA throughout the 1890s and early 1900s. Smullen holds the record for the most points scored in the Kildare Senior Football Championship final. He scored 1-10, and the game ended with Sallins winning 2–15 to Celbridge's 1-14. Smullen later went on to play wing-forward for Kildare when they won the 1903 All-Ireland Senior Football Championship. Smullen died in 1921, aged 52. The first ever winner of the cup was Sallins in 1925, they beat Timahoe to claim the cup. The competition was cancelled in 1995 because of lack of funds.

Participants
The winners of the competition came from throughout County Kildare but the  most successful teams were Sallins, Athy, Naas, Allenwood and Sarsfields.

During the late 1960s and early 1970s, teams from Dublin, Meath, Offaly also competed in the competition.

Defunct Gaelic football competitions
Gaelic football competitions in County Kildare
1925 establishments in Ireland